Lummox is a 1930 American pre-Code sound film directed by Herbert Brenon and starring Winifred Westover. It was released through United Artists, and based on a 1923 novel by Fannie Hurst.

Sound engineer Ed Bernds did not have fond memories of Brenon. "So many of the silent film directors were phonies. I didn't think highly of Herbert Brenon, for instance. He was the old, imperious type of director. Lordly, demanding. There was a scene in Lummox, where Winifred Westover was supposed to be betrayed by Ben Lyon, who has gotten her pregnant. He throws some money down and she takes the money and tears it up with her teeth. Well, Brenon demanded real money! And several takes. The poor propman was going around borrowing money from the crew. It was the Imperial syndrome of silent film directors."

Cast
Winifred Westover – Bertha Oberg
Dorothy Janis – Chita (*billed as Dorothy King)
Lydia Yeamans Titus – Annie Wennerberg
Ida Darling – Mrs. Farley
Ben Lyon – Rollo Farley
Myrta Bonillas – Veronica Neidringhous
Cosmo Kyrle Bellew – John Bixby
Anita Bellew – Mrs. John Bixby
Robert Ullman – Paul Bixby
Clara Langsner – Mrs. Wallenstein Sr.
William Collier, Jr. – Wally Wallenstein
Edna Murphy – May Wallenstein
Torben Meyer – Silly Willie
Fannie Bourke – Mrs. McMurtry
Myrtle Stedman – Mrs. Ossetrich
Danny O'Shea – Barney
William Bakewell – Paul Charvet
Sidney Franklin – Mr. Meyerbogen
Dickie Moore – Bit
Billy Seay – Petey

Plot
Berta Osberg, an uneducated Swedish servant, was given the derogatory nickname of Lummox, which means a slow or stupid person. Most people she met criticized her, but Rollo Farley, her employers' son, felt inspired by Berta, and wrote poetry about her, with lines that included "A tower of silence under the sea."

Rollo seduced Berta, and when she discovered she was pregnant, she left her employment without telling anyone of her condition. Her child was given to a wealthy family, and she sometimes learned about him from one of the family's servants. She was told the boy played the piano, and that his parents were sending him to Europe to study music. He was inspired to be a musician because of a concertina Bertha anonymously sent to her son.

Berta learned her son will be playing at Carnegie Hall. She bought a standing-room ticket and was able to see and hear her handsome son play the piano. At the end of the film Bertha was too old to be hired as a servant. She went into a bakery run by a kind widower, and was asked to live in his home and care for his motherless children.

Winifred Westover in title role
In order to portray the heavyset servant Westover ate fatty food, avoided exercise, and gained forty pounds. To help her appear to be a person who worked long hours of wearying labor the director gave her shoes soled with fifteen pounds of lead, and had her wear a dress with five pounds of lead weights in the collar, five pounds of lead in each of the sleeve cuffs, and ten pounds of weights in the hem of her skirt.

She received praise for her acting, with one newspaper stating: "Winifred Westover’s characterization of the buxom servant girl, whose little world has been the drab atmosphere of cheap lodging houses, shabby humanity and cruel employers, reaches heights rarely ever attained." It has at times been incorrectly reported that she was nominated for an Academy Award for Best Actress for her performance in the film. Academy Awards databases make no mention of such a nomination however.

Preservation status
Per IMDB, the film survives at the British Film Institute, and the soundtrack discs are preserved at the UCLA Film and Television Archive. The film had a Movietone soundtrack, however, discs were prepared for theaters not yet wired for sound-on-film.

References

External links
Lummox at IMDB
Lummox at AllMovie

1930 films
Films directed by Herbert Brenon
United Artists films
1930 drama films
American drama films
American black-and-white films
Films based on works by Fannie Hurst
1930s American films